The Terrible People may refer to:

 The Terrible People (novel), 1926 novel by Edgar Wallace
 The Terrible People (serial), 1928 American silent film serial based on the novel
 The Terrible People (film), 1960 West German film based on the novel